Dietrich Adam (16 October 1953  2 November 2020) was a German actor.

Career
He is best remembered for playing the hotelier Friedrich Stahl in the series Storm of Love between 2013 and 2017, and for his role in the renowned German police series Tatort.

Adam was born in Göttingen. He died in Berlin, aged 67.

References

External links 
 Dietrich Adam Website
 

1953 births
2020 deaths
German male television actors
Actors from Göttingen